"Ghost" is a song by Canadian singer–songwriter Fefe Dobson from her second (released) studio album, Joy (2010). It was produced by Kevin Rudolf, and co-written by Dobson, Rudolf, Kara DioGuardi and J. Kasher. The song officially impacted American mainstream radio on May 11, 2010, and was released as a digital single on June 21, 2010, by 21 Music and Island Records.

"Ghost" achieved success in Canada, attaining the peak position of #14 on the Canadian Hot 100 and being certified Platinum by Music Canada. The song appears on the MuchDance 2011 compilation that was released in November 2010.
It also was performed as the Lip Sync song of the 3rd episode of the second season of Canada's Drag Race.

Chart performance
"Ghost" debuted on the Canadian Hot 100 chart dated June 19, 2010, at number 98. The song peaked at #14 first attained on the chart for the week of August 21, 2010, due to high airplay and digital downloads. It was Dobson's first single to enter the Canadian adult contemporary charts, in addition to the airplay formats at which she was already established.

Music video
The music video was released on June 28, 2010, via Vevo.

The video starts off with Dobson leaving the club while her song "Watch Me Move" is playing. Her face suddenly goes blank as she discovers her boyfriend (played by actor Douglas Owens) kissing another girl in the back of a red Dodge Challenger. The songs starts as she peers through the open window. She is then seen dancing around the Challenger in black and white leather outfits. It also shows her boyfriend dreaming many hallucinations where he thinks Dobson is there, but she really isn't. When the second verse starts, he wakes up. There are shots of him aggressively playing the drums and his new girlfriend trying to comfort him as he gives her the cold shoulder. There are also scenes where Dobson is seen dancing on and around a bare bed in an abandoned building. During the second chorus, the boyfriend is shown secretly looking at pictures of him and Dobson, and neglecting a dinner his new girlfriend made for him but instead wandering the street. He hallucinates again and sees Dobson in the Challenger while they are making-out in the back, explaining that she caught him. During the breakdown of the song, he starts scratching his arm and a tattoo with Dobson singing appears, with the words "I Haunt You In Every Dream" underneath. He wakes up realizes it was just a dream, and tries to fall back asleep, only to find Dobson is sleeping next to him. When he looks back it is his girlfriend again, but now Dobson is dancing upside down from the ceiling, but then she disappears. The video ends as Dobson sets the mattress on fire, and his girlfriend leaves angrily because she found the pictures of Dobson hiding in his dresser.

Personnel
 Songwriting – F. Dobson, K. Rudolf, K. DioGuardi, J. Kasher
 Production – Kevin Rudolf
 Mixing – Serban Ghenea
 Mix engineer – John Hanes (Assisted by Tim Roberts)
 Instruments (except Drums) – Kevin Rudolf
 Drums – Dorian Crozier
 Vocal arrangement – Kara DioGuardi

Source:

Charts

Weekly charts

Year-end charts

Certifications

Release history

References

Fefe Dobson songs
2010 singles
Songs written by Fefe Dobson
Songs written by Kara DioGuardi
Synth-pop songs
Songs written by Kevin Rudolf
Songs written by Jacob Kasher
2010 songs
Island Records singles